Celatoria diabroticae is a species of bristle fly in the family Tachinidae.

Distribution
United States, Mexico.

References

Exoristinae
Insects described in 1871
Taxa named by Henry Shimer
Diptera of North America